Kentucky Route 635 (KY 635) is a  state highway in Pulaski County, Kentucky, that runs from Kentucky Route 70 east of Bethelridge to Kentucky Route 39 southwest of Dabney via Science Hill.

Major intersections

References

0635
0635